Cârța (also Cârța Săsească, ;) is a commune in Sibiu County, Transylvania, Romania. It is composed of two villages, Cârța and Poienița (Konradsdorf; Oláhtyúkos).

References

Communes in Sibiu County
Localities in Transylvania